Sir Patrick Alfred Jennings,  (20 March 183111 July 1897) was an Irish-Australian politician and Premier of New South Wales.

Early life
Jennings was born at Newry, Ireland, the son of Francis Jennings, a well-known merchant in that town. He was educated at Newry and at a high school at Exeter, England, and began a mercantile career. In 1852 he went to Australia and engaged in gold mining at St Arnaud, Victoria, but soon became a shop keeper, and then moved into quartz-crushing and bought a large pastoral property on the Murrumbidgee River. In 1857 he became a magistrate. He ran unsuccessfully for the Crowlands in the Victorian Legislative Assembly in 1859 and then became chairman of the St Arnaud Council. In 1863, he married Mary Ann Shanahan and moved to Warbreccan near Deniliquin.

In 1863 he became interested in the movement to form the Riverina district into a separate province, and two years later was asked to go to England as a delegate to bring the grievances of the district before the English authorities. He declined on the ground that it should be possible to clear up the difficulties with the New South Wales government.

Political career

Jennings was nominated to the Legislative Council in 1867. He resigned in 1870 to enter the Legislative Assembly as member for the Murray, but resigned in 1872 and was out of parliament for some years. He unsuccessfully contested the 1874 election for Mudgee, the Upper Hunter by-election in June 1875 and the 1877 election for Wellington. He was a New South Wales Commissioner at the colonial exhibition in Melbourne in 1875, represented the colonies of New South Wales, Queensland and Tasmania, at the Philadelphia exhibition in 1876, executive commissioner for the International Exhibition in Sydney in 1879.

Jennings was elected to the assembly again in 1880 as member for the Bogan and from January to July 1883 was Vice-President of the Executive Council in the ministry of Sir Alexander Stuart. He was Colonial Secretary from October to December 1885 in the first ministry of George Dibbs, and in February 1886 became the first practising Catholic Premier and was also Colonial Treasurer. His administration lasted only 11 months and had a troubled career, having inherited a financial crisis. His attempts to balance the budget included a 5 per cent ad valorem tariff, which came to be seen as a violation of his free-trade platform. Jennings was scarcely a strong enough man to control a ministry which included Dibbs, Want and Lyne. He did not contest the 1887 election.

Jennings represented New South Wales at the colonial conference held in London in 1887. He was nominated to the Legislative Council in 1890, and was one of the New South Wales representatives at the federal convention held at Sydney in 1891, but did not take a prominent part in the proceedings. He was vice-president of the Agricultural Society of New South Wales from 1876 to 1887 and helped to procure the Moore Park site for the Sydney Royal Easter Show.

Jennings was an amiable, cultivated man much interested in art and music; he contributed £1100 to Sydney University towards the cost of an organ for the great hall. He made many friends but was not a great parliamentarian, though he was a prominent figure in the public life of New South Wales for many years.

Jennings died at Brisbane on 11 July 1897. His wife had died in 1887, but he was survived by two sons and a daughter.

Honours
He was a leading man among his co-religionists. He actively sought honours and was fascinated with titles, publishing an essay on knighthood. In 1874 he was honoured by Pope Pius IX with the Order of St. Gregory the Great, and in 1876 was made a Knight Commander of the Order of Pope Pius IX and St. Gregory the Great; he also received the Knight Grand Cross of the Order of Pius IX from Pope Leo XIII. He was created Knight Commander of the Order of St Michael and St George (KCMG) in 1880, and was made an honorary Doctor of Laws (LL.D.) of Dublin University in 1887.

The town of Jennings, New South Wales was named in his honour.

References

 

1831 births
1897 deaths
Knights Commander of the Order of St Michael and St George
Australian Roman Catholics
Premiers of New South Wales
Members of the New South Wales Legislative Assembly
Members of the New South Wales Legislative Council
People from Deniliquin
Treasurers of New South Wales
People from Newry
Irish emigrants to colonial Australia
19th-century Australian politicians